Robert John Nussbaumer (April 23, 1924 – July 26, 1997) was an American football halfback and end in the National Football League (NFL) for the Washington Redskins, Green Bay Packers, and the Chicago Cardinals.  He played college football at the University of Michigan as a left halfback from 1943 to 1945 and served in the United States Marine Corps in 1945.  He was drafted in the third round of the 1946 NFL Draft.

After his playing career ended, he served as an assistant coach in the NFL.  He coached the defensive backs for the Detroit Lions from 1957 to 1962 prior to being promoted to defensive coordinator in 1963 after Don Shula left to take over as head coach for the Baltimore Colts.  After a year off in 1965, Nussbaumer returned to coach defensive backs with the Cleveland Browns from 1966 through 1971.

References

External links
 

1924 births
1997 deaths
American football ends
American football halfbacks
Chicago Cardinals players
Cleveland Browns coaches
Detroit Lions coaches
Green Bay Packers players
Michigan Wolverines football players
Washington Redskins players
United States Marine Corps personnel of World War II
Sportspeople from Oak Park, Illinois
Players of American football from Illinois